Germana Sperotto (born 6 February 1964) is an Italian cross-country skier. She competed in the women's 20 kilometres at the 1984 Winter Olympics.

Cross-country skiing results

Olympic Games

World Cup

Season standings

References

External links
 

1964 births
Living people
Italian female cross-country skiers
Olympic cross-country skiers of Italy
Cross-country skiers at the 1984 Winter Olympics
People from Ivrea
Sportspeople from the Metropolitan City of Turin